Verkhniye Murochi is a rural locality (a selo) in Kyakhtinsky District, Republic of Buryatia, Russia. The population was 10 as of 2010. There is 1 street.

Geography 
Verkhniye Murochi is located 53 km southeast of Kyakhta (the district's administrative centre) by road. Chikoy is the nearest rural locality.

References 

Rural localities in Kyakhtinsky District